Desire is a 1923 American silent drama film directed by Rowland V. Lee and starring Marguerite De La Motte, John Bowers, and Estelle Taylor. The film's sets were designed by art director John Hughes.

Cast

Preserrvation
With no prints of Desire located in any film archives, it is a lost film.

References

Bibliography
 Munden, Kenneth White. The American Film Institute Catalog of Motion Pictures Produced in the United States, Part 1. University of California Press, 1997.

External links

1923 films
1923 drama films
Silent American drama films
Films directed by Rowland V. Lee
American silent feature films
1920s English-language films
American black-and-white films
Metro Pictures films
1920s American films